Nabil Lasmari (born 8 February 1978) is a former French-Algerian badminton player. In France, he played for Roubaix, won four men's singles National Championships title in 1998, 2000, 2002 and 2004. While representating Algeria, Lasmari won the African Championships in 2006 and 2007, also the 2007 All-Africa Games. He competed at the 2008 Olympic Games in Beijing, China. He is now works as a coach in Chantecler club in Bordeaux, France.

Achievements

All-Africa Games 
Men's singles

African Championships 
Men's singles

Men's doubles

Mixed doubles

BWF International Challenge/Series 
Men's singles

Men's doubles

Mixed doubles

  BWF International Challenge tournament
  BWF International Series tournament
  BWF Future Series tournament

References

External links 
 
 

1978 births
Living people
French male badminton players
Algerian male badminton players
Badminton players at the 2008 Summer Olympics
Olympic badminton players of Algeria
Competitors at the 2007 All-Africa Games
African Games gold medalists for Algeria
African Games bronze medalists for Algeria
African Games medalists in badminton
Badminton coaches
21st-century Algerian people